Fabrizio Bernardi (born 1972) is an Italian astronomer and discoverer of minor planets and comets, best known for the co-discovery of the near-Earth and potentially hazardous asteroid 99942 Apophis.

In 2002, he discovered the outer main-belt asteroid 65001 Teodorescu at Campo Imperatore station, Gran Sasso, Italy, and named it after his wife, the Romanian astronomer Ana Teodorescu.

He was involved together with colleagues Marco Micheli and David Tholen, with observations of the Mars-crosser asteroid 2007 WD5 during his stay at the University of Hawaii observatory. While at the Mauna Kea Observatories in Hawaii, he discovered 268P/Bernardi, a Jupiter family comet.

The main-belt asteroid 27983 Bernardi, discovered by astronomers Andrea Boattini and Maura Tombelli at Cima Ekar, was named in his honor on 9 November 2003.

Publications 

ACM2002 Proceedings – Berlin: The Campo Imperatore Near Earth Objects Survey (CINEOS): Andrea Boattini, Germano D’Abramo, Giovanni B. Valsecchi, Andrea Carusi, Andrea Di Paola, Fabrizio Bernardi, Robert Jedicke, Alan W. Harris, Elisabetta Dotto and Fiore De Luise, et al. In press. 
Discovery of the heavily obscured Supernova SN2002CV. Astronomy and Astrophysics, v.393, p.L21-L24

Proceedings of the Planetologia Italiana Workshop – Bormio, Italy, 20–26 January 2001: 
CINEOS – Campo Imperatore Near Earth Objects Survey 
Expected background of asteroids and stars for the Wide Angle Camera of the Rosetta Mission

Asteroid background for the Wide Angle Camera of the Rosetta Mission, Poster, Division for Planetary Sciences 2001, New Orleans, USA

ESTEC Internal report, September 2000: Image simulation of the inner coma environment for the Wide Angle Camera of  the OSIRIS experiment

See also 
 
 
 Rosetta mission

References 
 

1972 births
Discoverers of minor planets
Discoverers of trans-Neptunian objects

21st-century Italian astronomers
Living people